Parwano Bhatti (6 February 1934 – 1 December 2016), was a prominent Sindhi-language poet, writer and journalist. He died at the age of 82.

References

1934 births
2016 deaths
Sindhi people
Sindhi-language poets
Sindhi-language writers